Irina Salomykova-Vaag (November 28, 1961 – April 12, 2015) was a Soviet-born, Russian sprint canoer who competed from the mid-1980s to the early 1990s. She won five medals at the ICF Canoe Sprint World Championships with a silver (K-4 500 m: 1985) and four bronzes (K-1 5000 m: 1990, K-2 500 m: 1989, K-4 500 m: 1987, 1989).

Salomykova-Vaag also competed in two Summer Olympics for two different nations. At the 1988 Summer Olympics in Seoul, she competed in two events for the Soviet Union by finishing fourth in the K-4 500 m and fifth in the K-2 500 m events. Four years later in Barcelona, Salomykova-Vaag competed for the Unified Team by finishing ninth in the K-4 500 m event though she was eliminated in the semifinals of the K-1 500 m event.

References

Irina Salomykova's profile at Sports Reference.com

1961 births
2015 deaths
Canoeists at the 1988 Summer Olympics
Canoeists at the 1992 Summer Olympics
Olympic canoeists of the Soviet Union
Olympic canoeists of the Unified Team
Russian female canoeists
Soviet female canoeists
ICF Canoe Sprint World Championships medalists in kayak